Senator Hope may refer to:

Alexander W. Hope (died 1856), California State Senate
Leighton A. Hope (1921–1998), New York State Senate
Sam Hope (politician) (1833–1919), Florida State Senate